Fanjanteino Félix (née Rakotomalala; born 26 January 1980) is a French middle distance runner. She originally competed for Madagascar and remains the country's national indoor record holder over 800 metres and 1500 metres. She competed in the heats of the 800 m at the 2008 IAAF World Indoor Championships. She was seventh in the 1500 m at the 2009 Mediterranean Games, and just missed out on a medal at the 2009 Jeux de la Francophonie taking fourth in the 800 m.

She set a personal best over 800 m at the Notturna di Milano meeting in September 2010, where she finished third in a time of 2:00.18 minutes.

Winner of the Indoor National 800m and 1500m Championships in 
2010, she was selected for France to attend the 
2010 World Indoor Championships.

Achievements

National 

French Athletic Championships : 
winner of 800 m in 2008, of 1,500 m in 2010. winner of 1,500 m Indoors in 2010.

Personal Bests

References

External links

1980 births
Living people
French female middle-distance runners
Athletes (track and field) at the 2009 Mediterranean Games
Mediterranean Games competitors for France
21st-century French women